BUC Saint Josse Rugby Club is a Belgian rugby union club currently competing in the Belgian Second Division.

The club is based in the Brussels suburb of Evere in the Brussels Capital Region.
The official colours of the club are red and white.

History
The club has won the Belgian Elite League title once in 1973 and the Belgian Cup once also in 1973. They were promoted from the 2nd Division in 2011 having won the league but were relegated following the 2012/13 season during which they finished bottom.

In the 2011/12 season they finished the regular season in sixth place.

Honours
 Belgian Elite League
 Champions: 1972-73
 Belgian Cup
 Champions: 1972-73
 Belgian 2nd Division
 Champions: 2010-11

Season by Season

See also
 Rugby union in Belgium
 Belgian Cup (Rugby Union)

External links
 Official site
 Belgian Federation

Belgian rugby union clubs
Evere